Carnevale is an Italian word derived from the Latin expressions carnis (meaning meat or flesh; ablative: carne) and "levare" (meaning remove). So "carnevale" means literally "remove meat". It refers to the Tuesday before Ash Wednesday, the beginning of Lent, the traditional Christian period of 40 days before Easter, commemorating the 40 days Jesus fasted in the desert, which was a period of abstaining from meat and other pleasures of the flesh. So it was the day to get those last enjoyments in. "Mardi gras" (French for "Fat Tuesday") refers to the same day. Also known as "Shrove Tuesday".

 Carnival, an overview

Carnevale may also refer to:

 Andrea Carnevale (born 1961), Italian former football player
 Carnival of Venice, an annual festival held in Venice, Italy
 Fra Carnevale ("Brother Carnevale", 1420/25 – 1484), Italian Renaissance painter
 Roberto Carnevale (born 1966), Italian composer

See also
 Carnevali, a surname
 Carnivàle, an American television series
 Carnival (disambiguation)